Germany competed at the 1998 Winter Paralympics in Nagano, Japan. 40 competitors from Germany won 44 medals including 14 gold, 17 silver and 13 bronze and finished 2nd in the medal table.

See also 
 Germany at the Paralympics
 Germany at the 1998 Winter Olympics

References 

1998
1998 in German sport
Nations at the 1998 Winter Paralympics